Ljusdals BK (LBK) is a Swedish bandy club currently playing in Elitserien (the top division in Swedish bandy). LBK was founded on 19 January 1943 and is playing at Gamla Idrottsparken (IP) in Ljusdal, Hälsingland. In 1975, the club won the Swedish national championship.
Ljusdal have a supporters group called "Ljusdal Lightnings".

Recent seasons
LBK managed to advance back to Elitserien in 2012 after five seasons in Allsvenskan (Ljusdals BK was relegated from Elitserien to Allsvenskan in 2006/07 after a loss against Tillberga on February 14).

Honours

Domestic
 Swedish Champions:
 Winners (1): 1975
 Runners-up (2): 1970, 1972

International
 World Cup:
 Runners-up (5): 1978, 1984, 1993, 1997, 1999

References

External links
 Official website

 
Bandy clubs in Sweden
Sport in Halsingland
Bandy clubs established in 1943
1943 establishments in Sweden